Blair High School is a public high school in Blair, Nebraska, United States. It is a part of Blair Community Schools. The  building was built in 1970 at a cost of $2.2 million.

The school's former building, built in 1889, has been listed on the National Register of Historic Places since 1991.  The original building was a two-story building in the Richardsonian Romanesque style, with a two-story Colonial Revival addition in 1929 and a one-story flat brick annex added in 1969.  The building has been converted to apartments, offices, and a social hall.

The school's newspaper, known as The Bear Tracks, is a student-made paper consisting of seven sections, and is issued at the end of every academic quarter.

The school's colors are purple and white; its athletic teams are the Bears. Blair High School is a member of the Eastern Midlands Conference and competes in Class B athletics and in mostly Class A fine arts. Blair High School's main rivals include Elkhorn and Gretna.

References

External links

 Blair High School
 About Blair High School

Public high schools in Nebraska
School buildings on the National Register of Historic Places in Nebraska
John Latenser Sr. buildings
Schools in Washington County, Nebraska
Richardsonian Romanesque architecture in Nebraska
National Register of Historic Places in Washington County, Nebraska
1889 establishments in Nebraska